Andreyevka is a rural locality (a settlement) in Trudovskoye Rural Settlement, Novousmansky District, Voronezh Oblast, Russia. The population was 81 as of 2010. There are 4 streets.

Geography 
Andreyevka is located 32 km northeast of Novaya Usman (the district's administrative centre) by road. Makarye is the nearest rural locality.

References 

Rural localities in Novousmansky District